Pahri is a rare alternative spelling for either:
 the Sino-Tibetan Pahari language of Nepal
 the Indo-Aryan Pahari language of Kashmir

See also 
 Pahari language, several languages